The Kuban long-barbelled gudgeon (Romanogobio pentatrichus) is a species of cyprinid fish endemic to the middle reaches of the Kuban River in Russia

References

Romanogobio
Fish described in 1998